The 2003 All-Ireland Minor Hurling Championship was the 73rd staging of the All-Ireland Minor Hurling Championship since its establishment by the Gaelic Athletic Association in 1928. The championship began on 5 April 2003 and ended on 14 September 2003.

Kilkenny entered the championship as defending champions.

On 14 September 2003, Kilkenny won the championship following a 2–16 to 2–15 defeat of Galway in the All-Ireland final. This was their 18th championship title overall and their second title in succession.

Kilkenny's Richie Power was the championship's top scorer with 1-29.

Results

Leinster Minor Hurling Championship

Group A

Group B

Quarter-finals

Semi-finals

Final

Munster Minor Hurling Championship

First round

Playoffs

Semi-finals

Final

Ulster Minor Hurling Championship

Final

All-Ireland Senior Hurling Championship

Quarter-finals

Semi-finals

Final

Championship statistics

Top scorers

Top scorers overall

Top scorers in a single game

References

Minor
All-Ireland Minor Hurling Championship